The 1991 Southeast Asian Games Men's Basketball Tournament  were held at the Araneta Coliseum in Quezon City, east of Manila.

Participating nations

Men's tournament

Preliminary round

Bronze medal match

Gold medal match

Women's tournament

Preliminary round

Bronze medal match

Gold medal match

Winners

Medal tally

References

1991
1991 in Asian basketball
1991 in Philippine basketball
International basketball competitions hosted by the Philippines
Basketball